Hyndman Middle-High School is 6-12 combined Middle School and High School located in Hyndman, Pennsylvania. It closed at the end of the 2010–2011 school year.

Sources 

High schools in Cumberland, MD-WV-PA
Public high schools in Pennsylvania
Schools in Bedford County, Pennsylvania
Public middle schools in Pennsylvania